Siwan district is one of the districts of Bihar state, India. Siwan town is the administrative headquarters of this district. Siwan district is a part of Saran Division since 1972. The district was previously also known as Aliganj Siwan after the name of Raja Ali Bux Khan. Siwan has historical and mythological importance attached to it. The Member of Parliament from Siwan is Kavita Singh.

History
Siwan district, situated in the western part of the state, was originally a sub-division of Saran district, which in ancient times formed a part of Kosala Kingdom. Siwan became a fully-fledged district when it was split from Saran in 1976.

Siwan was a part of Banaras Kingdom during the 8th century. Sikandar Lodi brought this area under his kingdom in the 15th century. Babar crossed Ghaghra river near Siswan in his return journey. By the end of the 17th century, the Dutch came first; followed by the English. After the battle of Buxar in 1764, it became a part of Bengal.Siwan has been religious centre of various religions.During 16th century Dhanauti Monastery was established and Bijak was written here.It is believed that lord Buddha gained Nirvana in Siwan.

Siwan played an important role in 1857 independence movement. A good number of them rebelled and rendered their services to Babu Kunwar Singh. The last ruler of Siwan was Raja Ismail Ali Khan. The anti pardah movement in Bihar was started by Sri Braj Kishore Prasad who also belonged to Siwan in response to the Non Co-Operative movement in 1920.

Demographics

According to the 2011 census Siwan district has a population of 3,330,464. of which 1,675,090 are males while 1,655,374 are females. This gives it a ranking of 101st in India (out of a total of 640). Population within the age group of 0 to 6 years was 551,418 which is 16.55% of total population of Siwan district. Its population growth rate over the decade 2001-2011 was 22.70%. Siwan has a literacy rate of 69.45%, and sex ratio of 988 females for every 1000 males, Siwan ranks 2nd in terms of sex-ratio (988) against the state’s 918. 5.49% of the population lives in urban areas. The Scheduled Castes and Scheduled Tribes population was 386,685 (11.61%) and 87,000 (2.61%) respectively. Siwan had 534,341 households in 2011.

At the time of the 2011 Census of India, 93.36% of the population in the district spoke Bhojpuri, 4.30% Urdu and 2.12% Hindi as their first language.

Politics 
  

|}

Administrative Division 
Siwan is divided into 2 sub-divisions, 19 Blocks, 4 municipalities and 293 Gram Panchayats (village councils).

Notable people
Rajendra Prasad, 1st President of India
Abdul Ghafoor
Apoorvanand
Avishek Sinha
Azazul Haque
Baccha Prasad Singh
Bishwanath Singh
Brajkishore Prasad
Chandrashekhar Prasad
Indradeep Sinha
Jai Prakash Narayan Singh
Janardan Tiwari
Kaushalendra Pratap Shahi
Kavita Singh
Khesari Lal Yadav
Mangal Pandey
Manoj Bhawuk
Meeran Haider
Mihir Diwakar
Mohammad Shahabuddin
Natwarlal
Nirupama Pandey
Om Prakash Yadav
Prabhavati Devi
Ramdev Singh
Ramesh Singh Kushwaha
Raza Naqvi Wahi
Satyendra Dubey
Shyam Bahadur Singh
Sunil Prasad
Syed Ali Akhtar Rizvi
Vashishtha Narayan Singh

References

External links
 Official website

 
Districts of Bihar
Saran division
1976 establishments in Bihar